Pedro Cristian González (born 1 June 1983) is an Argentine professional racing cyclist.

Career highlights

2008
2nd in Stage 7 Vuelta a San Juan, Palmar Del Lago (ARG)  
1st in General Classification Vuelta a San Juan (ARG)

References

External links

Overview

1983 births
Living people
Argentine male cyclists
Place of birth missing (living people)
21st-century Argentine people